The Maryborough Military & Colonial Museum is a non-profit museum located at 106 Wharf Street,
Maryborough, Queensland, Australia. It was established and is operated by John and Else Meyers for the benefit of the Fraser Coast community.

Displays

The museum houses a number of displays of subject such as Keith Payne, VC OAM; Herbert James, VC MC; Timothy Britten, CV; John Cantwell, AO DSC; Harry Smith, SG MC; and James Runham, SC AFSM OAM.

The museum has the largest number of Victoria Crosses in a private museum collection in Australia. The museum also has the only  Cross of Valour (Australia) medal on public display; the one awarded to Timothy Britten following the 2002 Bali bombings.

Heritage property
The museum occupies the former J. E. Brown warehouse, which is listed on the Queensland Heritage Register.

References

External links
 

Military and war museums in Australia
Maryborough, Queensland
1897 establishments in Australia
Military history of Queensland